Hocus-pocus is a  reference to the actions of magicians, often as the stereotypical magic words spoken when bringing about some sort of change. It was once a common term for a magician, juggler, or other similar entertainers. In extended usage, the term is often used (pejoratively) to describe irrational human activities that appear to depend on magic. Examples are given below.

Examples of the extended use of the term hocus-pocus
Those relating to divination or other activity by one practitioner working in isolation: Haruspication (divination by inspection of entrails), and necromancy.

Those relating to a magical connection between two or more people: Subconscious direction, cross-dreaming, extrasensory perception, split subjectivity, telepathy, clairvoyance, channelling, psychic transcription, ‘faculty X’, ‘mind energy’.

History 
The earliest known English-language work on magic, or what was then known as legerdemain (sleight of hand), was published anonymously in 1635 under the title Hocus Pocus Junior: The Anatomie of Legerdemain. Further research suggests that "Hocus Pocus" was the stage name of a well known magician of the era. This may be William Vincent, who is recorded as having been granted a license to perform magic in England in 1619. Whether he was the author of the book is unknown.

Conjectured origins 
The origins of the term remain obscure. The most popular conjecture is that it is a garbled Latin religious phrase or some form of ‘dog’ Latin. Some have associated it with similar-sounding fictional, mythical, or legendary names. Others suggest it is merely a combination of nonsense words.

Latin and pseudo-Latin origins 

One theory is that the term is a corruption of hax pax max Deus adimax, a pseudo-Latin phrase used in the early 17th century as a magical formula by conjurors.

Another theory is that it is a corruption or parody of the Catholic liturgy of the Eucharist, which contains the phrase "Hoc est enim corpus meum", meaning This is my body. This explanation goes at least as far back as a 1694 speculation by the Anglican prelate John Tillotson:

This theory is supported by the fact that in the Netherlands, the words Hocus pocus are usually accompanied by the additional words pilatus pas, and this is said to be based on a post-Reformation parody of the traditional Catholic rite of transubstantiation during Mass, being a Dutch corruption of the Latin words "Hoc est corpus meum" and the credo, which reads in part, "sub Pontio Pilato passus et sepultus est", meaning under Pontius Pilate he suffered and was buried. In a similar way the phrase is in Scandinavia usually accompanied by filiokus, a corruption of the term filioque, from the Latin version of the Nicene Creed, meaning “and from the Son”. The variant spelling filipokus is common in Russia, a predominantly Eastern Orthodox nation, as well as certain other post-Soviet states. Additionally, the word for "stage trick" in Russian, fokus, is derived from hocus pocus.

Magician's name 
Others believe that it is an appeal to the folkloric Norse magician Ochus Bochus: According to Sharon Turner in The History of the Anglo-Saxons, they were believed to be derived from Ochus Bochus, a magician and demon of the north.

Nonsense word 
As an alternative to other theories, it may simply be pseudo-Latin with no meaning, made up to impress people:

See also
Abracadabra
Barbarous names
Open sesame

References

External resources

 Hocus Pocus or The Whole art of Legerdemain. From the Marion S. Carson Collection in the Rare Book and Special Collection Division at the Library of Congress
 Hocus Pocus Junior: the Anatomie of Legerdemain From the Harry Houdini Collection in the Rare Book and Special Collection Division at the Library of Congress

17th-century neologisms
Magic (illusion)
Magic words